The 1977 Argentine Grand Prix was a Formula One motor race held at the Autódromo Oscar Alfredo Gálvez, Buenos Aires, Argentina on January 9, 1977. It was the first round of the 1977 Formula One season.

Qualifying

Qualifying classification

Race

Report 
The 1977 season started in Argentina, and it was reigning world champion James Hunt who started off his title defence with pole position in his McLaren. Countryman John Watson shared the front row with him in the Brabham, and Patrick Depailler in the six-wheeled Tyrrell was third on the grid.

Watson took the lead at the start with Hunt second. Watson led for the first 10 laps until Hunt moved ahead and pulled away, with Mario Andretti's Lotus third, but soon the other McLaren of Jochen Mass took the place. Mass had to retire soon after with an engine failure which caused him to spin, and a suspension failure took teammate and race leader Hunt out three laps later. Watson took the lead again, but he also had suspension failures and let teammate Carlos Pace through. Watson eventually retired, and Pace struggled towards the end due to heat in his cockpit and was passed by Jody Scheckter's Wolf and Andretti, but the latter retired then with a wheel bearing failure. Scheckter took the first win of 1977, with Pace second, and home hero Carlos Reutemann completing the podium for Ferrari.

Classification

Championship standings after the race

Drivers' Championship standings

Constructors' Championship standings

Note: Only the top five positions are included for both sets of standings.

References

Argentine Grand Prix
Argentine Grand Prix
Grand Prix
Argentine Grand Prix